Aida Brewer is the first female treasurer of the state of New York. Brewer was born March 27, 1955 in Mechanicville. In April 2002, Governor George Pataki appointed Brewer treasurer.

References

1955 births
People from Mechanicville, New York
New York State Treasurers
Women in New York (state) politics
Living people
21st-century American women